On 15 April 1969, a United States Navy Lockheed EC-121M Warning Star of Fleet Air Reconnaissance Squadron One (VQ-1) on a reconnaissance mission was shot down by a North Korean MiG-21 aircraft over the Sea of Japan.

The plane was an adaptation of a Lockheed Super Constellation and was fitted with a fuselage radar, so the primary tasks were to act as a long range patrol, conduct electronic surveillance, and act as a warning device.

The Nixon administration did not retaliate against North Korea apart from staging a naval demonstration in the Sea of Japan a few days later, which was quickly removed. It resumed the reconnaissance flights within a week to demonstrate that it would not be intimidated by the action while at the same time avoiding a confrontation.

Flight of Deep Sea 129

Beggar Shadow Mission
The code name "Beggar Shadow" was used to describe the late-1960s Cold War reconnaissance program by the United States Navy that collected intelligence about and communications between Soviet Bloc nations while remaining safely (at least according to international laws) in international waters.

At 07:00 local time of Tuesday, 15 April 1969, an EC-121M of the U.S. Navy's Fleet Airborne Reconnaissance Squadron One (VQ-1) took off from NAS Atsugi, Japan, on an intelligence-gathering reconnaissance mission. The aircraft, Bureau number 135749, c/n 4316, bore the tail code "PR-21" and used the radio call sign Deep Sea 129. Aboard were 8 officers and 23 enlisted men under the command of LCDR James Overstreet. Nine of the crew, including one Marine NCO, were Naval Security Group cryptologic technicians (CTs) and linguists in Russian and Korean.

Deep Sea 129's assigned task was a routine Beggar Shadow signal intelligence (SIGINT) collection mission. VQ-1 had flown the route and orbit for two years, and the mission had been graded as being of "minimal risk." During the first three months of 1969 nearly 200 similar missions had been flown by both Navy and U.S. Air Force reconnaissance aircraft off North Korea's east coast without incident.

These missions, while nominally under the command of Seventh Fleet and CINCPAC, were controlled operationally by the Naval Security Group detachment at NSF Kamiseya, Japan, under the direction of the National Security Agency.

The mission was tracked by a series of security agencies within the Department of Defense that were pre-briefed on the mission, including land-based Air Force radars in South Korea and Japan. The USAF 6918th Security Squadron at Hakata Air Station, Japan, USAF 6988th Security Squadron at Yokota Air Base, Japan, and Detachment 1, 6922nd Security Wing at Osan Air Base monitored the North Korean reaction by intercepting its air defense search radar transmissions. The Army Security Agency communications interception station at Osan listened to North Korean air defense radio traffic, and the Naval Security Group at Kamiseya, which provided seven of the nine CTs aboard Deep Sea 129, also intercepted Soviet Air Force search radars.

Interception and shoot-down
Very soon after arrival over the Sea of Japan, at 10:35, North Korea reacted to the presence of the EC-121, but not in a way that would jeopardize the mission. At 12:34 local time, roughly six hours into the mission, the Army Security Agency and radars in Korea detected the takeoff of two North Korean Air Force MiG-21s from East Tongchong-ni near Wonsan and tracked them, assuming that they were responding in some fashion to the mission of Deep Sea 129. In the meantime the EC-121 filed a scheduled activity report by radio on time at 13:00 and did not indicate anything out of the ordinary, but this was the last message sent from the plane. Twenty-two minutes later the radars lost the picture of the MiGs and did not reacquire it until 13:37, where they were closing with Deep Sea 129 for a probable intercept.

The communications that this activity generated within the National Security network were monitored by the EC-121's parent unit, VQ-1, which at 13:44 sent Deep Sea 129 a "Condition 3" alert by radio, indicating it might be under attack. LCDR Overstreet acknowledged the warning and complied with procedures to abort the mission and return to base. Approaching from the northeastern coast at supersonic speed, the MiGs easily overtook the EC-121, who could do little with their "warning." The MiGs were armed with 23 mm cannons and AA-2 Atoll missiles; the EC-121 was unarmed and without a fighter escort. At 13:47 the radar tracks of the MiGs merged with that of Deep Sea 129, which disappeared from the radar picture two minutes later. The MiGs had attacked and shot the plane down, and while the details of the incident have never been released to the public, it is assumed that an air-to-air missile was used as the North Korean press mentioned that a "single shot" downed the aircraft.

Reactions

Initial North Korean reaction
Immediately following the attack, the North Korean forces assumed a state of high alert.  Their media broadcast its version of events two hours after the incident.  Referring to the EC-121 as the "plane of the insolent U.S. imperialist aggressor army," the North Korean media accused it of "reconnoitering after intruding deep into the territorial air." The story cast it as "the brilliant battle success of shooting it down with a single shot by showering the fire of revenge upon it."

Initial United States reaction
At first none of the agencies were alarmed, since procedures also dictated that the EC-121 rapidly descend below radar coverage, and Overstreet had not transmitted that he was under attack. When it did not reappear within ten minutes VQ-1 requested a scramble of two Air Force Convair F-106 Delta Dart interceptors to provide combat air patrol for the EC-121.

By 14:20 the Army Security Agency post had become increasingly concerned. It first sent a FLASH message (a high priority intelligence message to be actioned within six minutes) indicating that Deep Sea 129 had disappeared, and then at 14:44, an hour after the shoot-down, sent a CRITIC ("critical intelligence") message (the highest message priority, to be processed and sent within two minutes) to six addressees within the National Command Authority, including President Richard M. Nixon and National Security Advisor Henry Kissinger.

Nixon regarded the attack as a total surprise and remained at a loss to explain it. The U.S. bureaucracy and the member of the National Security Council were also unable to understand the attack.

Soviet reaction
Despite being the height of the Cold War, the Soviet Union quickly provided assistance in the recovery efforts.  Two Soviet destroyers were sent to the Sea of Japan, and their involvement highlighted Moscow’s disapproval of the attack on the EC-121.

U.S. response

The US responded by activating Task Force 71 (TF-71) to protect future flights over those international waters. The ships for TF-71 came mostly from Southeast Asia duty. This deployment became one of the largest shows of force in the area since the Korean War.

Following the attack, some, including Representative Mendel Rivers responded to the attack by calling for retaliation against North Korea.  On April 16th, the United States National Security Council considered the following options:
	Show of force using naval and air forces
	Resumption of EC-121 missions with escorts
	"Select military combat actions" such as:
	Destruction of a North Korean aircraft over water
	Selected air strikes against a military target
	Shore bombardment of military targets
	Ground raids across the Demilitarized Zone
	Attack on military targets near the Demilitarized Zone by artillery or missile fire
	Attacks on North Korean naval vessels by U.S. submarines
	Blockade
	Mining/threatening to mine North Korean waters
	Seizure of North Korean assets abroad
	Use of strategic nuclear weapons
General Earle Wheeler, chairman of the Joint Chiefs of Staff, presented to the NSC a plan to attack North Korea with missiles carrying atomic warheads of 30 kilotons each, roughly equal to two-and-half times the bomb dropped on Hiroshima. Wheeler said such an attack likely would provoke retaliation. A day later, National Security Adviser Henry Kissinger told Nixon by telephone that, given the prospect of retaliation with the use of strategic warheads, "We might have to go to tactical nuclears." 

In addition to the NSC's ideas, the Joint Chiefs of Staff prepared several plans to bomb the airfield at Sondok and Wonsan.  If all went according to plan, bombers would attack the airfields under cover of night. CINCPAC proposed the positioning of ships, with missiles capable of taking down planes, in the Sea of Japan with orders to destroy North Korean aircraft, impound other North Korean vessels venturing into international waters (fishing boats, etc.), and fire onto the shore (especially near Wonsan).

In the end, no action was taken against the North Koreans in the days following the attack. The new Nixon administration had little to no information about the location and availability of both U.S. and North Korean forces, as the administration had difficulty communicating with those in the Pacific. By the time this information was communicated to the planners, it was too late to react. Both Nixon and National Security Advisor Henry Kissinger were ashamed at the outcome of the event, with Kissinger revealing that "our conduct in the EC-121 crisis as weak, indecisive and disorganized." Once it became clear that no action would be taken against the North Koreans, Nixon promised that "they’ll (i.e., North Koreans) never get away with it again," and ordered a "resumption of aerial reconnaissance flights."

Task Force 71, 1969

Motivation for the attack
A few theories have arisen to explain the unprompted take down of the EC-121, but all revolve around North Korea as a rogue entity. Nixon and his administration assumed that North Korea would behave within the standards of international law. Similar to the Pueblo incident, Pyongyang took action against the EC-121 plane despite it being located well outside North Korean territory.

Other sources claim that this attack may have taken place to honor Kim Il-sung, as his birthday fell on April 15, but not enough evidence exists to support this statement.

Some also believe that this may have been an accidental shooting, but many disagree because of the promptness of the media coverage in North Korea as well as its story that the plane had entered far into North Korean airspace. In the end, not enough information is available outside of North Korea to discern the true motive.

Historical significance

In order to fully understand this incident, North Korean foreign relations incidents from both the past and present should be considered. It was not out of the ordinary for the North Korean media to cover up incidents of North Korea breaking international law as foreign threats against national security.  These other events provide insight into understanding the actions of North Korea, as direct motives are unavailable.  Many international incidents that involve North Korea follow a similar structure, and point to the manipulative nature of the Kim regime in dealing with foreign nations; as well as the weak responses by U.S. forces.

Pueblo incident

The Pueblo Incident in 1968 marks another international incident, again involving the United States, in which North Korean ships attacked a boat surveying in international waters. A similar media approach was taken, and the North Korean populace received biased information about the incident.

Similarly, the United States and South Korean governments were outraged, and many in the populace demanded retribution for the attack. Immediately, nothing was done, and the captured crewmen were allowed to come home only after eleven months of negotiations and an embarrassing apology from the United States to North Korea.  Once the crew was returned safely to South Korea and news of their treatment reached Washington, the apology was rescinded.

The Soviet Union publicly backed North Korea during the height of the Cold War, but privately many disapproved of the decision. While relations with the other Cold War giant, China, remained the same.

Axe murder incident

In 1976, the North Koreans clashed again with the joint South Korean-United States forces in what is known as the axe murder incident. Southern forces were pruning a tree near the DMZ. The North Korean guards responded to the trimming with surprising hostility, sparking a violent brawl that culminated with the murder of two American soldiers, both of whom had been axed to death. Historically similar to this incident and the Pueblo incident, the North Korean retelling of events paints the United States and South Korean forces as the aggressors, and this incident almost led to a second Korean War.

Unlike the other incidents, however, in the end, the North Korean government apologized to the South Korean and American governments for the event, but relations between the three nations remained strained.

See also

 Hainan Island incident

Notes

References

Further reading
 Richard A Mobley (2003). Flash Point North Korea: The Pueblo and EC-121 Crises, Naval Institute Press.,
 NKIDP: Crisis and Confrontation on the Korean Peninsula: 1968-1969, A Critical Oral History
 James Weldon Sadler (2006). WestPac, iUniverse Inc., .
 "The National Security Agency and the EC-121 Shootdown", declassified 23 April 2013:

External links

 
 
 North Korean International Documentation Project (NKIDP)
 Photo of the EC-121M 135749 (PR-21)
 April 2001 OpEd on VQ-1 EP-3E (PR-32) Chinese force down and seizure compared to April 1969 VQ-1 EC-121 (PR-21) North Korean shoot down.
 U.S. Navy and National Reconnaissance During the Cold War
 1969 EC-121 shootdown incident and communication failures add immediate urgency to NSA establishment of new National SIGINT Operations Center

1969 in North Korea
1969 in the United States
20th-century aircraft shootdown incidents
Aviation accidents and incidents in 1969
Accidents and incidents involving the Lockheed Constellation
Aviation accidents and incidents in North Korea
Cold War military history of the United States
Combat incidents
Conflicts in 1969
Korean People's Army Air and Anti-Air Force
Military history of North Korea
April 1969 events in Asia
North Korea–United States relations